Château Hervé  is a château in the commune of Dachstein, in the department of Bas-Rhin, Alsace, France. It became a Monument historique on 1 October 1986.

References

Châteaux in Bas-Rhin
Monuments historiques of Bas-Rhin